Flickinger is a surname. Notable people with the surname include:

Andy Flickinger (born 1978), French cyclist
Daniel Flickinger, audio engineer
Daniel Kumler Flickinger (1824–1911), American bishop
Don Flickinger (1907–1997), American surgeon
Hali Flickinger (born 1994), American swimmer
Jason Flickinger (born 1977), American rower

See also
Burt Flickinger Center, a sports venue in Buffalo, New York, United States
Flickinger Center for Performing Arts, a theater in Alamogordo, New Mexico, United States